Richard William Pearse (3 December 187729 July 1953) was a New Zealand farmer and inventor who performed pioneering aviation experiments. Witnesses interviewed many years afterward describe observing Pearse flying and landing a powered heavier-than-air machine on 31 March 1903, nine months before the Wright brothers flew.  Ambiguous statements made by Pearse himself make it difficult to date the aviation experiments with certainty. In a newspaper interview in 1909, with respect to inventing a flying machine, he said "I did not attempt anything practical with the idea until 1904".

Biographer Gordon Ogilvie credits Pearse with "several far-sighted concepts: a monoplane configuration, wing flaps and rear elevator, tricycle undercarriage with steerable nosewheel, and a propeller with variable-pitch blades."

Pearse largely ended his early flying experiments about 1911 but pioneered on in novel aircraft and aero-engine invention from 1933 with the development of his "private plane for the million", a foldable single-engined tiltrotor convertiplane.

Early life
Richard William Pearse, born at Waitohi Flat, South Canterbury, New Zealand, on 3 December 1877, was the fourth of nine children of Digory Sargent Pearse (1844–1932) of South Petherwin, Cornwall, England, and Sarah Anne Brown (c.1850–1937) of County Londonderry, Ireland. Digory had migrated to New Zealand via South Australia in 1864–1865 and had taken up farming at Upper Waitohi, near Temuka. There he met and married Sarah, who'd come to New Zealand to be with her sister at Temuka in about 1867.

From musical stock, Digory and Sarah taught each of their children to play a musical instrument and formed a family orchestra. Richard played the cello, which he always kept close to hand. The family were also good tennis players; his brother Warne competing in New Zealand championships for some 25 years.

Richard Pearse attended the Waitohi Flat School from 1883 and Upper Waitohi School from 1891 to 1893, where, deep in thought at times and as a keen reader, he pursued an interest in technology. Peter Friel, a classmate at Upper Waitohi School, told researchers that Pearse came to school one morning with a device he'd made from a herring in tomato sauce tin cut to form a multi-blade rotor, mounted to a cotton reel base—a string-pull helicopter. Seated on its launcher’s peg and placed on a bench, he wound string around the reel and pulled away, whereupon the reel-rotor flew off and out of sight. Friel continued, "That’s how he got the start of that flying business!" Pearse revealed to The Timaru Post in 1909 that: "From the time I was quite a little chap, I had a great fancy for engineering, and when I was still quite a young man, I conceived the idea of inventing a flying machine."

His father's investment in eldest son Thomas's medical degree at Edinburgh put aside any thought of support for his aspiration to study engineering at Canterbury College in Christchurch. Instead, at age 21 in 1898, his father set him up with the use of 100 acres (40.5 ha) of Waitohi farmland, upon which, over the next 13 years, he established a workshop, realised his ideas for bicycles, aero engines, flying machines and other contraptions, and kept some 76–286 sheep.

Career

Early engineering work
A possible hint of Pearse's earliest flying machine work at Waitohi, South Canterbury, came from Jean Currie. When interviewed by researchers Tom Bradley and Geoff Rodliffe she recalled that quite some time before her family moved from Waitohi Flat to Morven in 1899, her father, Thomas Currie, farmer, and uncle, Alexander McClintock, blacksmith, had walked up to Pearse's workshop one Sunday only to return soon after, saying: "If he gets that contraption in the air he will fall out and kill himself." Witness accounts indicate that Pearse may have been working on a flying machine before 1904, although he stated that he began in February–March 1904.

In 1902, at Waitohi, Pearse invented a novel bell-crank pedal-lever type bicycle with self-inflating tyres. Messrs Martin and Co. of Christchurch built the bicycle, and Pearse made key components himself. Traveling up to Christchurch, he filed a patent application for the invention, via his newly appointed patent agent Henry Hughes, with the Christchurch Patent Office on 8 February 1902 (New Zealand Patent no. 14507)—his first patent. Coincidentally, on the day the Patent Office issued Letters Patent, Pearse's bicycle drew public attention when he rode it in to Temuka on Sale Day, Tuesday, 19 May 1903, and Timaru on Wednesday, 20 May 1903.

It appears that at that time he was also building the light horizontally opposed double-acting two-cylinder "oil engine" described in the provisional specification of his 19 July 1906 patent, An Improved Aerial or Flying Machine (New Zealand Patent no. 21476), indicated in Figure 1 of the complete specification and recovered in part as two relic cylinders in 1971. As no light suitably powered engines could be purchased at that time, many pioneering inventors made their own. Cecil Wood, who had established the Tourist Cycle Works at Timaru in 1896, built gunpowder and gasoline engines since 1895, constructed New Zealand's earliest motorcar with first road test in 1897 and motor-bicycles from December 1901, told George Bolt and Harold Cederman that he had instructed Pearse on making engines in 1901 and 1902. He recalled showing Pearse how to make spark plugs with a central electrode wrapped in mica and helping with surface carburetor design. Crudely built, this engine appears to be Pearse’s earliest, preceding his light 25 hp (18.64 kW) horizontal double opposed single-acting four-cylinder engine, which, Pearse informed the Minister of Defence in May 1945, he'd started to work on from about February 1904, a few months after Samuel Langley's aeroplane failed to fly. He referred to the 25 hp motor as an "aeroplane motor", his "first motor" and the "first single-acting 4 cylinder motor".

At some point Pearse mounted the engine within the flying machine—a tricycle undercarriage surmounted by a fabric-covered bamboo wing structure. In general layout the machine resembled modern aircraft design: monoplane rather than biplane; tractor rather than pusher propeller. Witnesses tended to agree that the flying machine had no tail section.

Flights
Ever since the first aviation experiments, the use of the term "flight" has often been contentious because it has no universally agreed definition. Researcher Geoff Rodliffe uses the term to describe a powered flying machine being airborne for even a short time.

Some early aviators such as the Wright Brothers defined flight as being sustained, controlled and powered in a heavier-than-air flying machine to a predetermined location. Critics including Pearse argue that this falls short of perfecting flight, as a flying machine launched from a catapult launching device is not able to take off again once it lands at its destination.

Other aviators including Richard Pearse defined "flight" as taking off and landing at a predetermined location and then immediately returning to the take-off location. This would typically require that the flying machine have wheels. In 1915 Pearse wrote in a letter to a newspaper:

The honour of inventing the aeroplane cannot be assigned wholly to one man; like most inventions, it is the product of many minds. After all, there is nothing that succeeds like success, and for this reason, pre-eminence will undoubtedly be given to the Wright Brothers, of America, as they were the first to make successful flights with a motor-driven aeroplane. At most America can only claim to have originated the aeroplane. The honour of perfecting it and placing it on its current footing belongs to France.

In a 1928 letter to a newspaper, Pearse summarises his own progress towards achieving flight:

At the trials it would start to rise off the ground when a speed of twenty miles an hour was attained. This speed was not sufficient to work the rudders, so, on account of its huge size and low speed, it was uncontrollable, and would spin round broadside on directly it left the ground. So I never flew with my first experimental 'plane, but no one else did with their first for that matter.

Researchers into Pearse's aeronautical work had located some 55 surviving witnesses by the 1980s. In assigning a principal category to each witness at that time, though some may cross categories, 20 had seen a flight or more, 9 had seen a plane on a hedge or in the workshop awaiting repairs, 2 had heard the plane in flight but did not see it, 7 had a second hand account of seeing flight, 10 knew of flights and 7 had seen or knew of the flying machine under construction.

Some witness accounts suggest Pearse flew in 1902; others indicate a series of flights in 1903, ending in winter that year. Some dateable events recalled as occurring about the time of the flights were: immediately after excessive flooding of the Opihi River on 23–24 March 1902; on 31 March, preceding April Fools' Day; within a year of the end of the Second Boer War and following the disbanding of the 9th Contingent, New Zealand Mounted Rifles, South Island Regiment, in New Zealand on 21 August 1902; about the time of Eugen Sandow's visit to Timaru, 26–29 December 1902; during Honora Crowley's last teaching year at Upper Waitohi School to September 1903; and before the Big Snow snowstorm from 11 July 1903. Following decades of research to establish dates, 31 March 1903 is noted by historians as the day when Pearse may have achieved some sort of witnessed flight.

1903 March 31, Tuesday
Eyewitnesses describe Pearse crashing into a hedge during 1903. His monoplane may have risen to a height of at least  on each occasion. Evidence exists that on 31 March 1903 Pearse achieved a powered, though poorly controlled, flight of several hundred metres.

1903. Multi-lap Paddock Flight, Richard Pearse's Farm, Waitohi
Casey recalled that Miss Crowley let her students out of school to watch the event. He thought the event lasted about ten minutes. In a letter to Geoff Rodliffe, Casey described the flying machine as having a tricycle undercarriage supporting a wing about 5–6 feet (about 1.5–1.8 metres) above ground and provided an accurate drawing showing the points of takeoff and landing.

The flight had to have occurred before Miss Crowley left the district in September 1903.

Casey believed that Pearse's brother, Warne, spun the propeller; however, Warne and others apparently never referred to such an impressive flight. Warne, though, had pulled the propeller to start the engine on the previous flight run from the Upper Waitohi School. Casey also named five other people who may have witnessed the flight. Though several independently recalled Miss Crowley as their teacher at that time, four described other flight attempts and the fifth died before he could be interviewed.

If Casey's observations could be verified, this would be the first controlled flight in the world by a powered aeroplane.

1903 April 11, Holy Saturday, Easter. The Terrace Flight, Opihi River, Waitohi
Robert Mitchell Gibson's accounts of a flight were considered by researchers to be amongst the most credible. Born 2 December 1895, he was 8 years old when his older brother Ramsay, age 13 years, took him on another cycle excursion, this time with a number of youths to help Pearse prove his flying machine.

Gibson recalled that Pearse had transported his flying machine with a dray and couple of horses from his shed to a terrace field above the Opihi River. On the first run, the flying machine headed down the hill and into a clump of gorse. After the boys had pulled the machine out and up the top to the dray, they and Pearse inspected the ground for half an hour in preparation for another run. The boys then headed Pearse and his flying machine on toward the cliff but after about  they were left behind as the flying machine gathered speed by its own thrust. As the flying machine went over the cliff and into the air, the boys watched it turn and fly up the river up to  gradually going downwards. They ran diagonally across the paddock to find a wet Pearse scrambling up the riverbank.

Gibson was certain the flight took place in the Easter school holidays before Easter, or Easter Saturday (11 April), 1903. He dates the flight as having occurred shortly before the severe snowstorm of 1903—the Big Snow. This was the only snow to fall from 1902 to 1905. Gibson also dates the flight as occurring shortly after his brother Ramsey turned 14 in 1903. After his birthday, Ramsey immediately moved away from Waitohi to work. Ramsey never returned to Waitohi and died in 1908.

Gibson also served during the Great War, and recalled that he had been involved in a fight as a result of claiming that he had seen a New Zealander fly before the Wright Brothers. The Royal Navy consistently recorded Gibson's character as "VG".

Gibson's later attempts to identify the other youths present at the Opihi River terrace flight were not successful.

Arthur Tozer, who was about 17 years old at the time, recalled an event similar enough to be the same; that whilst driving a horse-drawn carriage through the Opihi riverbed he saw Pearse fly overhead but thought he had flown on to land on the terrace. Multiple independent hearsay accounts unrelated to Gibson's flight were made by several sources. Because of the multiple witness and hearsay accounts, it is considered hard to doubt that Pearse at some time made an attempt to fly off the Opihi River terrace.

1903 May 2, Saturday. Paddock Flight, Richard Pearse's Farm, Waitohi
Alexander Amos Martin was sure in his accounts of the flight he had seen. He recalled that he was about 16 and a half years old when he saw one of Pearse's flight. Martin and his father had finished chaff cutting a stack of sheaves on Dick Connell's farm about 2:00 pm. From Upper Waitohi's main road he could see an odd contraption in Pearse's paddock. "He could not go any higher because he had no more Power the engine was all out and the under carriage and wheels caught in the gorse fence." Martin took off on his bicycle and rode on after his father's chaff cutting plant.

Amos Martin stated that, "The time Pearse flew was on May 2nd 1903 at between half past two in the afternoon and four o'clock." "It was the year of the Big Snow." Writing to Joseph Coll on 23 May 1967, Martin said "I say this that it was Pay-day and Pay-day was the first Saturday of the month." He left Temuka for the coalmine at Nightcaps, Southland, in August 1903.

1903. Paddock Flight, Richard Pearse's Farm, Waitohi
Daisy Moore Crawford (later Mrs McLean), born 1892, recalled that she saw Pearse's flying machine in the air. She was with her father, William, who was a close friend of Pearse, on the hillside at the back of Pearse's farm. When interviewed by Anna Cotterill and filmed by Hutton for TV One News in 1976, she said: "I can remember it lifting up and coming down, and veering towards the road where there was a gorse fence, and landed on the gorse fence. And that gorse fence and the plane stuck in my mind, always!" Daisy didn't think he'd hurt himself but had landed with the cushion effect of the gorse hedge. When asked if there were a lot of people watching him, Daisy replied: "There was no one watching him! Well there was those girls up at the hill like, but, down, when you come down near the homestead, his own little cottage, on the right hand side, over, there was just himself and his plane. But I can remember there might have been somebody on the road, but I never saw anyone [watching him]." In a letter to Geoff Rodliffe dated 5 September 1976, Clifford Crawford, Daisy's brother, said Daisy was certain the event occurred on Tuesday, 31 March 1903.

1903 April–May
He recalled his teacher at Fairview, Mrs Christian Ritchie, telling the children that Pearse had flown. Writing to Joseph Coll on 25 May 1967, Frank Biggs said,"Now regarding the flight, I can remember it pretty clearly it would be late April or early May. Spud digging time. I think Mr Martin as he witnessed the flight would be correct with his statement." Biggs thought the year to be between 1902 and 1904. Mrs Ritchie, head teacher at Fairview School since 1894, retired from teaching in April 1906, and presented with gifts from her many friends and well wishers, left the settlement.

1903
Sisters, Annie Fraser (later Mrs Casey) and Margaret Fraser (later Mrs Esler), recalled that they were on a hill filling sacks of potatoes dug by David Stumbles, when they heard Pearse's flying machine in the distance. They piled up potatoes and threatened that if Pearse flew in their direction they would pelt him with spuds.

Pearse designed his first oil engine as a horizontally opposed two-cylinder four-chamber four-stroke type with pistons connected by a single piston rod with crank-arm and crank mechanism at the centre. Researchers recovered components of his engine (including cylinders made from cast-iron drainpipes) from a farm rubbish dump in 1971. With a  engine, Pearse's design had an adequate power-to-weight ratio to become airborne (even without an aerofoil). He continued to develop the ability to achieve fully controlled flight. Pearse incorporated small "ailerons". Diagrams and eyewitness recollections agree that Pearse placed controls for pitch and yaw at the trailing edge of the low-aspect-ratio kite-type permanently stalled wing. This control placement (located in turbulent air-flow, and close to the centre of gravity) would have had minimal, possibly inadequate, turning moment to control the pitch or yaw of the aircraft. The Wright brothers, in comparison, successfully applied the principles of airfoil wing-profile and three-axis control to produce fully controlled flight.

1909
Pearse reappeared in the newspapers in late 1909 with his latest huge 700-900 sq ft flying machine powered by a 24-horsepower motor.

The Otago Witness, 1 December 1909, also observed that "Mr Pearse has always been of an inventive turn of mind, as a visit to his workshop will show. Just lately the Scientific American printed an idea of his for an improved sparking plug for either high or low tension." Though fruitless searches for the article over decades had left researchers with doubts about its existence, it finally came to light during a search of Auckland Libraries’ bound volumes in 1999. R W Pearse's 'The Handy Man's Spark Plug' was published in the 4 September 1909 issue of Scientific American, and again in Alexander Russell Bond's Handy Man’s Workshop and Laboratory, a Scientific American Series publication, in 1910. Pearse's handy man's spark plug, having a wire within a central tube, utilised the pressure of the engine's compression stroke to operate a valve, to vibrate the connected terminal wire into contact the central tube's terminal, to produce multiple sparks.

Pearse's work remained poorly reported at the time, and no contemporary newspaper accounts appear to exist of his early 1900s efforts. Some later photographic records survived, but they are undated with some images difficult to interpret. Pearse's own statements, interpreted though modern day lenses, have bamboozled many researchers, writers and critics. For many years such led the few who knew of his feats to accept 1904 as the date of flying. Unconcerned about posterity and in remote New Zealand, he received no public credit for his work during his lifetime. Pearse patented his design, but his innovations—such as ailerons and the lightweight air-cooled engine—did not succeed in influencing others.

Later activities
Pearse moved to Milton in Otago in about 1911 and discontinued his flying experiments due to the hillier country there. Much of his experimental equipment got dumped in a farm rubbish-pit. However, he continued experimenting and produced a number of inventions. He subsequently moved to Christchurch in the 1920s, where he built three houses and lived off the rentals.

Throughout the 1930s and 1940s, Pearse continued to work on constructing a tilt-rotor flying-machine for personal use – sometimes described as a cross between a windmill and a rubbish-cart. His design resembled an autogyro or helicopter, but involved a tilting propeller/rotor and monoplane wings, which, along with the tail, could fold to allow storage in a conventional garage. He intended the vehicle for driving on the road (like a car) as well for flying.

In 1951, aged 73 years, he was admitted to Sunnyside Hospital, Christchurch, diagnosed as suffering from arteriosclerotic psychosis, a common ailment among the elderly. He died there two years later. Researchers believe that many of his papers were destroyed at that time.

Claims
The Public Trustee administered Pearse's estate following his death in 1953. The trust officer was instructed to place the properties and saleable articles up for auction and dump Pearse's patented convertiplane invention. Setting in motion a serendipitous train of events, the auctioneer George Anderson offered the convertiplane to the Canterbury Aero Club. Following inspection by the clubs's chief flying instructor, engineer and captain, their captain, Harry Walker, purchased it himself for £5 in June 1954 to save it from the scrap heap. They transported it to the club's hangar at Harewood, along with Pearse's powercycle as part of the lot. Intrigued by the shed find, Walker also rescued, examined and sorted what was left of Pearse's papers and patents from the trustee's rubbish heap and the yard. Sometime later, during a stopover at Christchurch Airport, Captain John Malcolm, NAC, caught sight of Pearse's dismantled convertiplane in the hangar, and reported the find to aviation pioneer George Bolt in Auckland. As a result, Bolt went to see Pearse's last flying machine during his next visit to Christchurch in March 1956. It is at this point that the tide turned for Richard William Pearse and his lifetime pursuit of aviation invention, from certain obliteration to recognition.

In 1958, Bolt excavated the South Canterbury dump site and discovered some components, including a propeller. His research in the 1950s and 1960s produced evidence for flight in 1903: people who had left the district by 1904 remembered the events, and recalled a particularly harsh winter with heavy snow.

During filming of a television documentary in the 1970s, the crew attached a replica of Pearse's 1902–03 machine by a rope to a horse. When the horse bolted, the pilotless machine took to the air and flew laterally stable for some considerable distance before landing clumsily with slight damage, surprising all and prompting an impression that it was flyable. Unfortunately, as the cameras had been put aside, the event went unfilmed.

Debunking the myth

In a 1909 newspaper interview, Pearse said "I did not attempt anything practical with the idea until, in 1904, the St Louis Exposition authorities offered a prize of £20,000 to the man who invented and flew a flying machine over a specified course. I did not, as you know, succeed in winning the prize, neither did anybody else." He also wrote two letters to local newspapers in 1915 and 1928. In his letter 'Who Invented the Aeroplane?' to the Evening Star, Dunedin, 10 May 1915 he stated: "The question is Who invented it first? I thought of it long before I took out a patent..." Also, "The honor of inventing the aeroplane [...] is the product of many minds [but] pre-eminence will undoubtedly be given to the Wright brothers [...] as they were actually the first to make successful flights with a motor-driven aeroplane". The Wright brothers made successful controlled flights at Huffman Prairie, Ohio, in late 1904, and with their first practical aeroplane, Flyer III, in 1905. In the 1928 letter to The Star, Pearse recounted what happened during his early attempts: "At the trials it would start to rise off the ground when a speed of twenty miles an hour was attained. This speed was not sufficient to work the rudders, so, on account of its huge size and low speed, it was uncontrollable, and would spin round broadside directly after it left the ground. So I never flew with my first experimental plane, but no-one else did with their first for that matter".

Aviation executive Evan Gardiner defended the legacy of his great uncle, Richard Pearse. In a newspaper article he emphasized that biographer Gordon Ogilvie had found 48 eyewitness accounts of aircraft work by Pearse and his attempted flights between 1902 and 1904. Gardiner wrote, "48 is too high a number for all to be misled, misinformed, over-imaginative, senile, lying or stupid."

Legacy

At the dawn of the 20th century, a number of enthusiasts in several countries advanced towards powered heavier-than-air flight. Pearse, as one of several designers contemporary with the Wrights, advanced some distance towards controlled flight. However, Pearse's designs and achievements remained virtually unknown beyond the few who witnessed them and they had no impact on his contemporary aviation designers.

Museum of Transport and Technology (MOTAT) in Auckland holds Pearse's last aeroplane, a tilt-rotor convertiplane, his 25 hp four-cylinder engine and metal propeller from the later first flying machine, his powercycle  and other original artefacts. The collection includes the created for the 1975 television docudrama Richard Pearse, based on Pearse's patent, witness descriptions and early 1900s technology.

South Canterbury Museum in Timaru displays material relating to Pearse and to his contribution to early aviation.

Pleasant Point Museum and Railway in Pleasant Point displays original Pearse engine artefacts and other items.

South Canterbury Aviation Heritage Centre in Timaru displays material relating to Pearse. The collection includes interpretations of Pearse's earliest flying machine constructed for the Richard Pearse Centenary of Flight 1903-2003 (MOTAT and South Canterbury Aviation Heritage Centre), for experiment and public display, along with several experimental two-cylinder engine reconstructions based on the remnants and descriptions of Richard Pearse's original engines.

The Richard Pearse Memorial stands at Waitohi, South Canterbury, where Pearse made attempts at powered flight.

The South Island lakeside town of Wānaka has a line of tiles mounted on the sidewalk by the lake listing important historic world and New Zealand events. The 1903 tile says that the first powered flight in history occurred in Timaru, and at the bottom of the tile for 1903 the Wright Brothers were listed as having also flown that year. Millennium path tiles were removed in 2019 in preparation for future lake shore redevelopment.

Popular culture

The arts have commemorated Richard Pearse's remarkable achievements over the years.

Poetry
 Solo Flight (1982) by William (Bill) Sewell. A series of meditations about the South Canterbury aviator Richard Pearse. .

Plays
 The Pain and the Passion (2000) by Sherry Ede. Performed at the Rose Centre Theatre, Belmont, Auckland, by Company Theatre, 10–24 June 2000; MOTAT, Auckland, for the Richard Pearse Centenary of Flight 1903–2003, 2003. Director: Sherry Ede; and Canterbury Repertory Theatre, Christchurch, for the Richard Pearse Centenary of Flight 1903–2003, 2003. Director: Penny Giddens .
 Too High the Son (1996) by Stephen Bain and France Hervé. Performed at City Gallery, Wellington; Downstage Theatre, Wellington; Maidment Theatre, Auckland.
 Jean and Richard (1990) by Mervyn Thompson. A fantasy in which Jean Batten and Richard Pearse meet in the afterlife. Performed by the Court Theatre, Christchurch, 1990.
 Pearse (1981) by John Leask. Performed by the Little Theatre Section, South Canterbury Drama League, 1981. Director: Dawn Somerville; and by the Little Theatre Section, Timaru, for the Richard Pearse Centenary of Flight 1903–2003, 2003.

Film and Television
 A Century of Flight: A Tribute to Richard William Pearse (2003). Documentary by Bob Jessopp, Horizon Video Communications. MOTAT, Auckland. An overview of the Richard Pearse Centenary of Flight 1903–2003.
 Forgotten Silver (1995). Mockumentary by filmmakers Costa Botes and Peter Jackson. Purports to uncover a long-lost segment of motion picture film that, with digital enhancement of a newspaper seen in one shot, "proves" that Pearse successfully flew in March 1903, predating the Wrights' achievement by several months. IMDb
 The New Adventures of Black Beauty: The Birdman (1990). Isambard Productions' continuation of the 1970s UK television series. A young inventor attempts to fly in a Richard Pearse-like contraption. IMDb
 Off the Ground – 1: The First to Fly (1982). Documentary by the National Film Unit. Richard Pearse leads off a three-part series on the history of aviation in New Zealand.
 Richard Pearse (1975). Docudrama, New Zealand Television One (NZBC). Set during his first flying machine efforts, the film focuses on Pearse's reclusive manner and local perceptions of his eccentric activities. IMDb

Novel, Novella and Short Story
 Oh, for the Wings of a Moth (1999) by Helene Moore and Geoff Rodliffe. An historical novel woven around the life of Richard Pearse.
 The Red Menace (1999-2002). An eight-part Doctor Who/The War of the Worlds crossover fan fiction novella by Jeff Stone published in the New Zealand Doctor Who fanzine Reverse the Polarity!, nos 6–13, January 1999–November 2002, extensively features Pearse as the co-creator of flying machines used to battle the returning Martian invaders. The unpublished extended version features material outlining Pearse's lonely journey to Britain to try to interest businessmen in his "aero-nautical device" designs.

Music
 To the Sky composed by Dwayne Bloomfield—Assistant Bandmaster, New Zealand Army Band, and Musical Director, Timaru Municipal Band. Performed by massed bands directed by Dwayne Bloomfield at the Richard Pearse Centenary Concert, Theatre Royal, Timaru, 29 March 2003.
 I Can Fly in the Dark composed by Natasha Murphy. Performed at the Richard Pearse Centenary Concert, Theatre Royal, Timaru, 29 March 2003.
 He Flys composed by Dave Denize. A ballad performed by Dave Denize at the Richard Pearse Centenary Concert, Theatre Royal, Timaru, 29 March 2003.

See also
 List of firsts in aviation
 Harry Houdini: The Aviator — Houdini's flight at Diggers Rest, Friday, 18 March 1910.

References

Bibliography

External links
Pearse aero engine and flying machine makers
 'Reproduction Pearse confirmed for January airshow', New Zealand Aviation News, 2011
 Richard Pearse aircraft replica project part 1, 16 August 2012
 Richard Pearse aircraft replica project part 2, 16 August 2012
 Flight of Fancy–Ivan Mudrovcich, Radio New Zealand
 Pearse Aircraft Wing Build Time Laps Video, 11 May 2013
 Will it Fly?, Official Trailer HD, Eye On U Productions Ltd, 30 June 2013
 'Replica Pearse plane on course for lift-off' by Esther Ash-Coventry, The Timaru Herald, Stuff, 05 July 2013
 'From the West to the Sky', Western Leader,  14 July 2013
 'Grounded: Illness ends mission to fly Pearse replica' by Phil Taylor, New Zealand Herald, 20 October 2017
 Tribute to a good friend of Whitianga, The Informer, Mercury Bay, 29 August 2018
 'An Engine Imagined: Puzzling Out Richard Pearse’s Engine' by Roger Lacey, The Shed magazine, 01 May 2019
 'Edwardian Era Replica Flying Machines of New Zealand - A Plethora of 1903 Pearse Replicas', NZ Civil Aircraft: A Blog on New Zealand Civil Aircraft, 27 May 2019

Richard Pearse Centenary of Flight 1903-2003
 'Bamboo Dick, first in flight' by Debbi Gardiner, Salon, 22 August 2002
 U.S. Centennial of Flight Commission: Calendar of Events
 'Three replica engines at Pearse Centenary Pageant', Scoop Independent News, 4 February 2003
 'Remembering New Zealand's visionary aviator' by Warren Gamble, New Zealand Herald, 14 March 2003
 'Crosswinds', A commemoration of the 100th anniversary of Pearce's flight, RadioNZ
 'First to Fly Mystery' by David Killick, Freelance Journalist and Photographer
 'Kiwis hail farmer who beat the Wright brothers into the air’ by Kathy Marks, Independent, 31 March 2003

Biographical
 'This New Zealand Farmer Revolutionized Modern Planes', Smithsonian Channel, Smithsonian Magazine
  Richard William Pearse, 1877-1953 Christchurch City Libraries
 'Richard Pearse: Was he the first man to 'fly' a mechanically powered aeroplane?', 2011. Eyewitnesses information and links to video clips
 'Man's First Powered Flight: Richard Pearse, Waitohi, New Zealand, March 31, 1902' by Bill Sherwood
 Richard Pearse, New Zealand History
 'Story: Pearse, Richard William', Te Ara: The Encyclopedia of New Zealand
 Pictures of Richard Pearse and his flying machine
 'Richard Pearse: First Flyer', NZEDGE.com
 'Research' by Geoff Rodliffe, AvStop.com
 'New Zealand's Air Machines; Pearse - Ogilvie – Schaef' by Geoffrey Rodliffe, AvStop.com

Research
 ‘New details help pin down Richard Pearse’ by Gordon Ogilvie, The Press, 26 November 2011
 'New evidence Pearse did not fly before Wright brothers' by Jeff Hampton, 3 News, 14 April 2012
 'Richard Pearse Missing Aircraft Photo from the early 1900s', Eye On U Productions Ltd, 2013

1877 births
1953 deaths
Aerospace engineers
Aviation inventors
Aviation pioneers
New Zealand aviators
1900s New Zealand aircraft
New Zealand farmers
20th-century New Zealand inventors
People from Temuka
New Zealand people of Cornish descent
People from Milton, New Zealand